In mathematical physics, the wave maps equation is a geometric wave equation that solves

where  is a connection.

It can be considered a natural extension of the wave equation for Riemannian manifolds.

References

Equations